Kirwin Christoffels (born 31 October 1994) is a South African cricketer. He was part of South Africa's squad for the 2014 ICC Under-19 Cricket World Cup.

References

External links
 

1994 births
Living people
South African cricketers
Eastern Province cricketers
People from Queenstown, South Africa
Cricketers from the Eastern Cape